The Hsintien line was a Taiwanese railroad branch line, located in Taipei City and New Taipei City operated by the Taiwan Railway Administration (TRA). It connected the city of Taipei with Xindian District in New Taipei.

History 
The Hsintien line was 10.4 km long  and was opened on 21 January 1921. It originally had 14 stations, but 6 stations (Sin Kung Temple(Senkōbyō), Seibinkaisha-mae, Nijūchō, Kōgakkō-mae and Bunsan County Hall (located after Hsintien Station), were abandoned after World War II. Kungkuan Station closed on 1 November 1963, with the entire line being shut down on 24 March 1965. The TRTS Xindian Line currently operates on a route similar to the old TRA Hsintien Line.

See also 
 Tamsui railway line

1921 establishments in Taiwan
1965 disestablishments in Taiwan
Former buildings and structures in Taiwan
Railway lines in Taiwan